The 1973–74 San Antonio Spurs season was the first season for the newly named San Antonio Spurs, who had spent the past six seasons as the Dallas Chaparrals in the American Basketball Association. 
The Spurs made their debut on October 10, 1973, vs the San Diego Conquistadors in San Antonio, losing 121–106. Afterwards, the Spurs would win just 6 of their next 13 games. By the end of November, they would be back to .500. By February the Spurs were at 34–33, but they would win 11 of their next 16 games to finish the season 3rd in the 3 team Western Conference, going to the playoffs. In the 1974 ABA Playoffs, the Spurs lost in the first round 4–3 to the Indiana Pacers.

ABA Draft

Regular season

Schedule

Season standings

Roster

ABA Playoffs
Western Division Semifinals

References

Spurs on Basketball Reference

External links 
RememberTheABA.com 1973–74 regular season and playoff results
RememberTheABA.com San Antonio Spurs page
RememberTheABA.com 1973–74 game by game results

San Antonio
San Antonio Spurs seasons
1973 in sports in Texas
1974 in sports in Texas